Jacques P. Schneider (25 July 1879 – 1 May 1928) was the French financier, balloonist and aircraft enthusiast, who created the Schneider Trophy.

Life

Jacques P. Schneider was born near Paris on 25 July 1879. 
His father was Paul Henry Schneider (1841-1916), and his grandfather was Adolphe Schneider (1802-1845), founder of Société Schneider et Cie.
Jacques Schneider was trained as an engineer at the Ecole des Mines.
He was the wealthy heir to an industrial empire based on metallurgy and armament manufacturing, which had prospered with the development of railways, iron ships and modern weapons such as machine guns, tanks and artillery.

He married Françoise Bourlon de Rouvre (1885-1931), daughter of Charles Bourlon de Rouvre.
They had two daughters: Monique (1908-1995), who married her cousin Étienne de Ganay (1899-1990), whose descendants Étienne et Monique de Ganay were part of the expedition of La Korrigane, and Louise-Charlotte (14 July 1912 - 29 May 2012), co-founder of the Maison d'Ananie.

Schneider had a taste for adventure, and took in turn to racing hydroplane boats, ballooning and piloting early airplanes.
He became a balloon pilot with the Aéro-Club de France in 1908.
His interest in engine powered heavier-than-air flights started when he saw Wilbur Wright performing a flight demonstration in Le Mans in August 1908.
In 1911 he was given airplane pilot certificate number 409.
At this time airplanes were lightly built of wood and canvas, and easily damaged.
Forced to abandon flying after a severe accident, he became a constant financial supporter of various flight contests.

Jacques Schneider was made a Knight of the Legion of Honor.
The Schneider arms business was driven into bankruptcy after the war, and Schneider was reduced to poverty.
Jacques Schneider died on 1 May 1928 at Beaulieu-sur-Mer on the French Riviera.

Schneider cup

Schneider thought that seaplanes had a great future since so much of the Earth is covered by water, 
which could be used for takeoff by large, heavy aircraft without the need to build runways.
On 5 December 1912, at the Aéroclub de France he proposed an annual contest for seaplanes, the "Coupe d'Aviation Maritime Jacques Schneider" (Schneider Trophy), to support the technical progress of civil aviation. Participants had to fly a distance of at least . 
The reward for the winner was 25,000 gold francs and a cup worth the same as the prize. 
If a nation won the cup three times within five years, the cup would belong to them.

The first Schneider cup competition was held in 1913 in the Mediterranean off Monaco and another competition was held the next year. The competition was suspended during World War I, then resumed in 1919. Nine more races were held until the competition was permanently suspended in 1931.
The races did not achieve Schneider's objective of furthering commercial aviation by developing robust long-range airplanes.
Instead, they became an object of intense national competition, with designs built only to win the cup and of little use for other purposes. The race did however prove important for the innovation of military aircraft and liquid cooled engines.

References

Sources

Further reading
 Jean-Louis Beaucarnot, Les Schneider, une dynastie, Hachette Littérature, 1986
 Elvire de Brissac, Ô dix-neuvième !, Grasset, prix Femina Essai, 2001
 Elvire de Brissac, Il était une fois les Schneider, Grasset, 2007
 Dominique Schneidre, Les Schneider, Le Creusot, Fayard, 1995
 Les Schneider, Le Creusot, une famille, une entreprise, une ville, 1836-1960, catalogue de l'exposition

French balloonists
French financiers
Burials at Père Lachaise Cemetery
1879 births
1928 deaths
Balloon flight record holders
French aviation record holders